Thummala Nageswara Rao is Telangana Rashtra Samithi (TRS) politician who has at various times been a minister in the Government of Andhra Pradesh and, later, in the Government of Telangana. He is from the Khammam district.

Early life
Nageshwar Rao was born on 15 November 1953 and is from Gollagudem village (Gandugula Palli) of Dammapeta Mandal in Khammam District. He completed B.Com before entering in politics.

Career
He joined TDP in 1982 election but lost the 1983 election. Rao was elected on three occasions to the Legislative Assembly of Andhra Pradesh as a Telugu Desam Party (TDP) candidate from Sathupalli constituency, in 1985, 1994 and 1999.

Though he is actually from Sathupalli, due to changes in reservation of seats in constituencies, he contested the 2009 elections from the Khammam constituency and defeated his opponents Younis Sulthan and Jalagam Venkatrao.

He contested that seat again in the elections of 2014 and lost by a margin of little over 6,000 votes. On that latter occasion, the election was for the Telangana Legislative Assembly due to the bifurcation of Andhra Pradesh.

He joined Telangana Rashtra Samithi in September 2014, and was inducted into cabinet in December 2014 and serving as Minister for Roads and Buildings Department in present TRS Government.

Having served for some time as a member of the Telangana Legislative Council, in May 2016 Rao again gained an Assembly seat when he won the Palair constituency in a by-election,
winning with a majority of 45,676 votes. On this occasion he was a TRS candidate, and was inducted into cabinet in December 2014, serving as Minister for Roads and Buildings.

Positions held
As a TDP MLA in the Andhra Pradesh legislature, Rao was Minor Irrigation Minister in the cabinet led by N. T. Rama Rao and held the ministerial portfolios of Prohibition and Excise, Major Irrigation, and Roads and Buildings at various times during the successive governments led by Chandrababu Naidu.

In December 2014, soon after leaving the TDP for the TRS, Rao became a minister in the TRS cabinet. He took the portfolios of Roads and Buildings, and Women and Child Development.

References

Telangana Rashtra Samithi politicians
Living people
Place of birth missing (living people)
1953 births
Telugu Desam Party politicians
Andhra Pradesh MLAs 1985–1989
Andhra Pradesh MLAs 1994–1999
Andhra Pradesh MLAs 1999–2004
Telangana MLAs 2014–2018
Members of the Telangana Legislative Council
People from Khammam district